Brachydeutera is a genus of shore flies in the family Ephydridae. There are about 16 described species in the genus Brachydeutera.

Species
These 16 species belong to the genus Brachydeutera:

B. adusta Mathis & Ghorpade, 1985
B. africana Wirth, 1964
B. argentata (Walker, 1852)
B. brunnea Wirth, 1964
B. congolensis Wirth, 1964
B. dentata Mathis & Winkler, 2003
B. hardyi Wirth, 1964
B. hebes  (Cresson, 1926)
B. ibari Ninomyia, 1929
B. longipes Hendel, 1913
B. munroi Cresson, 1939
B. neotropica Wirth, 1964
B. pleuralis Malloch, 1928
B. stuckenbergi Wirth, 1964
B. sturtevanti Wirth, 1964
B. sydneyensis Malloch, 1924

References

Ephydridae
Diptera of North America
Diptera of South America
Diptera of Africa
Diptera of Australasia
Taxa named by Hermann Loew
Ephydroidea genera